Cynoglossus browni, commonly known as the Nigerian tonguesole is a species of tonguefish. It is commonly found in Eastern Atlantic Ocean off the coast of west Africa, from Senegal to Angola. It is found on soft substrates such as mud or sand between depths of 15m and 40 m. Its main food is small benthic invertebrates.

References

Cynoglossidae
Fish described in 1949